Dieter Ecklebe (born 16 October 1939) is a German former tennis player.

Born in Holzminden, Lower Saxony, Ecklebe was first called into the West Germany Davis Cup team in 1959, featuring in a tie against Brazil. He appeared in two further ties in 1961.

Ecklebe had a win over Ken Fletcher in the first round of the 1962 French Championships.

In 1964 he was West German national singles champion.

See also
List of Germany Davis Cup team representatives

References

External links
 
 
 

1939 births
Living people
West German male tennis players
German male tennis players
Sportspeople from Lower Saxony
People from Holzminden